Kathleen Kramedas McGuiness (born February 14, 1967 in Dover, Delaware) is an American politician who was the Delaware state auditor, from January 2019 until October 2022. In July 2022, she was found guilty on multiple corruption charges. 

On September 13, 2022, McGuiness lost her primary to challenger Lydia York in a 42-point landslide. In October 2022, she was sentenced to one year of probation and was given a $10,000 fine for her corruption convictions. Following the conviction, McGuiness resigned as Auditor.

Early life and career
McGuiness graduated from Cape Henlopen High School in 1985. She earned her bachelor's degree in biology at the Florida Institute of Technology and her bachelor's degree in pharmacy from Northeastern University in Boston. After returning to Delaware, she bought a pharmacy in Rehoboth Beach, Delaware, where she was elected a town commissioner in 2000. She sold her pharmacy in 2002 to become a real estate agent.

In 2010, McGuiness and her family moved to Park City, Utah, and she resigned from the Rehoboth town board in 2012 because she was unable to attend the meetings. She moved back to Delaware and was elected to another term as a town commissioner in 2014. As a member of the Democratic Party, McGuiness ran for lieutenant governor of Delaware in 2016, but she lost the party's nomination in the primary election. She was subsequently appointed to the Delaware State University Board of Trustees by then governor, Jack Markell and reelected to the town board in 2017.

Delaware state auditor
In 2018, McGuiness ran for state auditor. She won the Democratic Party nomination, defeating Kathleen Davies and former state representative Dennis E. Williams in the primary election. She defeated Republican James Spadola in the general election to become the first woman elected to the position. She was sworn into office on January 1, 2019, replacing Republican Tom Wagner, who had decided not to seek reelection after serving in the office since 1989.

Corruption charges, convictions, and resignation
On October 11, 2021, McGuiness was indicted on two felony charges and several misdemeanor charges alleging that she paid her daughter and her daughter's friend nearly $30,000 from the state for jobs they did not work, orchestrated no-bid contracts for former campaign consultants while avoiding reporting requirements, and engaged in email surveillance and other intimidation of employees who became aware of her misconduct, among other charges. Her attorney released a statement saying that she is "absolutely innocent of these charges", and the next day, she turned herself in and pleaded not guilty to all the charges.

On July 1, 2022, McGuiness was found guilty of conflict of interest, structuring, and official misconduct. She was found not guilty of felony theft and intimidation. She faced up to 1 year in prison, but had a presumptive sentence of probation.

On August 31, 2022, a judge overturned McGuiness's structuring conviction, but upheld her convictions of conflict of interest and official misconduct. Her request for a new trial was denied.

On October 19, 2022, McGuiness was sentenced to one year of probation, 500 hours of community service, and was given a $10,000 fine for conflict of interest and official misconduct. Later that day, she resigned from her position as Auditor. Carney was responsible for selecting McGuiness's successor. He chose Dennis Greenhouse, who previously served as Auditor from 1983 to 1989.

References

External links
 Government website
 Campaign website

21st-century American criminals
21st-century American politicians
21st-century American women politicians
1967 births
American female criminals
American pharmacists
American people of Greek descent
Delaware Democrats
Delaware politicians convicted of crimes
Delaware State Auditors
Florida Institute of Technology alumni
Living people
Northeastern University alumni
Overturned convictions in the United States
People from Rehoboth Beach, Delaware
Women pharmacists